Bayville may refer to a community in the United States:

 Bayville, Maine
 Bayville, New Jersey
 Bayville, New York